Phalangopsis is a Neotropical genus of crickets (Orthoptera: Ensifera) in the family Phalangopsidae, subfamily Phalangopsinae, tribe Phalangopsini.

Species
The Orthoptera Species File lists:
Phalangopsis arenita Mews & Sperber, 2008
Phalangopsis araguaia Pereira Junta, Castro-Souza & Lopes Ferreira, 2020
Phalangopsis bauxitica Mews & Sperber, 2008
Phalangopsis carvalhoi Costa Lima & Costa Leite, 1953
Phalangopsis ferratilis Pereira Junta, Castro-Souza & Lopes Ferreira, 2020
Phalangopsis flavilongipes Desutter-Grandcolas, 1992
Phalangopsis gaudichaudi Saussure, 1874
Phalangopsis kyju Pereira Junta, Castro-Souza & Lopes Ferreira, 2020
Phalangopsis kysuia Pereira Junta, Castro-Souza & Lopes Ferreira, 2020
Phalangopsis longipes Serville, 1831 - type species (by subsequent designation, localities French Guiana, Brazil)
Phalangopsis quartzitica Pereira Junta, Castro-Souza & Lopes Ferreira, 2020

References

External links
Image on Flickr
 

Ensifera genera
crickets
Orthoptera of South America